Mys is a rural locality (a village) in Kalininskoye Rural Settlement, Totemsky District, Vologda Oblast, Russia. The population was 22 as of 2002.

Geography 
Mys is located 38 km southwest of Totma (the district's administrative centre) by road. Ustye is the nearest rural locality.

References 

Rural localities in Totemsky District